That Lovely Girl is a 2014 Israeli-French drama film directed by Keren Yedaya. It was selected to compete in the Un Certain Regard section at the 2014 Cannes Film Festival. The film is an adaptation of the novel Away From His Absence by Shez. The story follows Tami, who is in a toxic incestuous relationship with her father Moshe, which she is unable to break free from.

Cast
Maayan Turjeman as Tami
Tzahi Grad as Moshe
Yaël Abecassis	as Shuli
Tal Ben-Bina as Iris

Reception
The Hollywood Reporter described the film as "oddly flat", but praised the cast, "who give rich, sustained performances".

References

External links
 

2014 films
2014 drama films
Israeli drama films
French drama films
2010s Hebrew-language films
Incest in film
2010s French films